1,1'-Ferrocenediisocyanate (1,1'-diisocyanatoferrocene) is the organoiron compound with the formula . It is the simplest diisocyanate derivative of ferrocene. It can be synthesized by the Curtius rearrangement of the diacyl azide, using several protocols starting from 1,1'-ferrocenedicarboxylic acid. The compound is useful as an intermediate in the synthesis of 
1,1'-diaminoferrocene by hydrolysis of the isocyanates. Various poly(siloxane–urethane) crosslinked polymers can be formed by reaction with siloxane-diols. These compounds are of interest as electrochemically active polymers that might have good mechanical properties at low temperature.

References 

Ferrocenes
Cyclopentadienyl complexes
Isocyanates